South Brighton railway station is a former railway station on the Seaford line in Adelaide, South Australia. It was located about 15.8 kilometres from Adelaide station. The station closed in 1976, and was demolished shortly after, A newer station was built 200 metres to the south of that station in the same year. The old subway that went below the old station was in use until the early 1990s, but has now been filled in and replaced with a ground level passenger walkway. Adjacent to the old station is a disused delicatessen (now residential) building that served the station's passengers, and then the local population until the early 1990s.

References
Thompson MH. "The Goodwood - Brighton - Willunga line." ARHS bulletin, 336, October, 1965.

Disused railway stations in South Australia
Railway stations closed in 1976